Pasquel may refer to

 Jorge Pasquel, Mexican businessman
 José Tola Pasquel, Peruvian engineer
 José Manuel Pasquel, Peruvian archbishop
 Keerthi Pasquel, singer
 Sylvia Pasquel, Mexican actress